Caramelito (Candy) is the title of a studio album released by Spanish performer Rocío Dúrcal on 6 May 2003 by BMG Ariola. Produced by Colombian songwriter Kike Santander. The album was nominated for a Latin Grammy Award for Best Female Pop Vocal Album at the 2004.

This album contains a selection of tracks that cross the Rhythmic pop and the romantic ballad, with songs of big composers as: Raúl Ornelas, José Alfredo Jiménez, Luis Carlos Monroy, Claudia Brant, kiko Cibrian and Kike Santander, Its lead single "Caramelito" enjoyed moderate success on Spain and Latinamerica.

Track listing

Awards 

Latin Grammy Award

Credits and personnel 
Musicians
 Rocío Dúrcal – (Vocals)
 Kike Santander – (Words and Music).
 Milton Salcedo – (Piano, Keyboards, Programming)
 Bernardo Ossa – (Keyboards, Programming)
 Salvador Cuevas – (Baby bass, Bass 5th)
 Richard Bravo – (Acoustic guitar and Clarinet)
 Manny Lopez – (Lower sixth)
 José Hernández – (vihuela and Trumpet)
 Jose Gaviria, Milton Salcedo, Bernardo Ossa and Daniel Betancourt – (Keyboards, Programming)
 Tedoy Mullet – (Percussion)
 Alfredo Oliva – (Concertino)

Production
 Producers: Kike Santander.
 Words and music topics: Kike Santander (except those mentioned).
 Arranger: Milton Salcedo, Bernardo Ossa and Daniel Betancourt.
 String Arrangements: Milton Salcedo
 Engineer: Esteban Aristizabal, Vicky Echeverri, Claudia Garcia, Juan Cristobal Losada, Boris Milan, Catalina Rodriguez.
 Engineering, programming and production under: Jose Gaviria.
 Musical Director: Antonio Morales.
 Contributors: Alberto Carballo Cabiedes, Sergio Minsky.
 Programming and Production Agreement: Milton Salcedo Rope.
 Executive Director and co-ordination of production: Andrés Felipe Silva.
 Recorded at: More Music, DB Music Productions Studios, Studio G, Miami, More Studios, Santander Studios, The Gallery Recording Studios Recording Studios and Ultrasound.
 Photographer: Adolfo Pérez Butron.
 Label: RCA Records, BMG Music, Ariola Records.
 Distributed by RCA International and Ariola International.

References 

2003 albums
Rocío Dúrcal albums